Jason Houghtaling is an American football coach who is the offensive line coach for the Tennessee Titans of the National Football League (NFL). Houghtaling served as the head football coach at Wagner College from 2015 to 2019, compiling a record of 16–40.

Coaching career
Houghtaling was hired by the Tennessee Titans as an offensive line assistant on February 11, 2021.

Head coaching record

College

References

External links
 Tennessee Titans profile
 Wagner profile

Year of birth missing (living people)
Living people
American football defensive linemen
Colgate Raiders football coaches
Cornell Big Red football coaches
Lafayette Leopards football players
Tennessee Titans coaches
Wagner Seahawks football coaches
Williams Ephs football coaches
High school football coaches in New York (state)
Binghamton University alumni
Wagner College alumni
People from Windsor, New York
Coaches of American football from New York (state)
Players of American football from New York (state)